Harvey M. Meyerhoff (born April 6, 1927) is an American businessman, fundraiser, and philanthropist. He is the son of Joseph Meyerhoff. Harvey is a chairman of the trustees of Johns Hopkins Hospital and Chairman of the United States Holocaust Memorial Museum. Meyerhoff served on the advisory board of U.S. English, an organization that supports making English the official language of the United States.

References

1927 births
Living people
American construction businesspeople
American real estate businesspeople
American people of Ukrainian-Jewish descent
Businesspeople from Baltimore
English-only movement
Jewish American philanthropists
Maryland lawyers
20th-century American philanthropists
University of Wisconsin–Madison alumni